The University of Camerino is a university located in Camerino, Italy. It is the best university of Italy among those with fewer than 10,000 students, according to the Guida Censis Repubblica 2011 and 2012 ranking. It claims to have been founded in 1337 and was officially recognized by the Pope in 1723. It is organized into five faculties.

History

Writer and jurist Cino from Pistoia, living in Marche in the years 1319–22, and in Camerino in the spring of 1331, described the territory as teeming with law schools. Camerino became a center of learning by year 1205, offering degrees in civil law, canonical law, medicine, and literary studies. Upon the request of Gentile III da Varano, Gregory XI issued the papal edict of 29 January 1367, addressed to the municipality and to the people, authorizing Camerino to confer (after appropriate examination) bachelor and doctoral degrees with apostolic authority, although only in legal studies and only for a limited period. After Camerino lost its importance as a political centre, the university declined and had vanished by 1600.

In 1723, Benedict XIII founded the Universitas Studii Generalis with the faculties of theology, jurisprudence, medicine, and mathematics. On 13 April 1756 the validity of the degrees from Camerino was extended to the whole territory of the Holy Roman Empire and the title of palatine count bestowed on the vice-chancellor. In 1871, after annexation by the Kingdom of Italy, the university was proclaimed "free" and it remained so up to 1959, when it became a State University.

Organization
These are the five faculties in which the university is divided into:

 School of Architecture and Design (located in Ascoli Piceno)
 School of Law
 School of Pharmacy
 School of Science and Technology
 School of Biosciences and Veterinary Medicine

Campus
Students enrolled at the University of Camerino may live on campus. Its location is in the north of Camerino at the city's border. On the campus there are apartments for two or more people, each with separate bedrooms, a kitchen and a bath room.
A shuttle bus (regular bus line) takes the students with a valid Unicam bus ticket into the city center for free.

Points of interest 
 Arboretum Apenninicum
 Orto Botanico dell'Università di Camerino, the university's botanical garden

See also 
 List of early modern universities in Europe
 List of Italian universities
 Camerino

References

External links
 University of Camerino Website
 University of Camerino Website

 
1336 establishments in Europe
14th-century establishments in Italy
Educational institutions established in 1727
1727 establishments in the Papal States
Culture in le Marche
Buildings and structures in Camerino
Camerino
1727 establishments in Italy